Marvel's Agents of S.H.I.E.L.D.: Slingshot is an American digital series created for ABC.com, based on the Marvel Comics organization S.H.I.E.L.D. and the character Yo-Yo Rodriguez. It is set in the Marvel Cinematic Universe (MCU) and acknowledges the continuity of the franchise's films and other television series; it is a supplement to Agents of S.H.I.E.L.D. The series is produced by ABC Studios and Marvel Television, with executive producer Geoffrey Colo leading the series' crew.

The series follows Rodriguez on a mission before the events of the fourth season of Agents of S.H.I.E.L.D. Natalia Cordova-Buckley reprises her role as Rodriguez from Agents of S.H.I.E.L.D., along with Clark Gregg, Chloe Bennet, Jason O'Mara, Ming-Na Wen, Iain De Caestecker, Elizabeth Henstridge and Henry Simmons. Slingshot was revealed at the end of the Agents of S.H.I.E.L.D. episode "The Laws of Inferno Dynamics" in December 2016, with members of the main series' production team also working on the spin-off.

All six episodes of Agents of S.H.I.E.L.D.: Slingshot were released on December 13, 2016. It received a positive critical response, and won a Webby Award, along with nominations for a Primetime Emmy Award, Streamy Award, and Writers Guild of America Awards.

Premise 
Elena "Yo-Yo" Rodriguez is forced to sign the Sokovia Accords by S.H.I.E.L.D. (Strategic Homeland Intervention, Enforcement, and Logistics Division) because she is an Inhuman. This creates a conflict with a personal mission she is looking to complete.

Cast and characters

Main 
 Clark Gregg as Phil Coulson: An agent and former director of S.H.I.E.L.D.
 Chloe Bennet as Daisy Johnson / Quake: A former agent of S.H.I.E.L.D. She is an Inhuman with earthquake-generating abilities.
 Natalia Cordova-Buckley as Elena "Yo-Yo" Rodriguez: A Colombian Inhuman who can move at super speed for a beat of her heart, before returning to the point she started moving from. She is an asset to S.H.I.E.L.D. Cordova-Buckley said the series explores how Rodriguez feels about her abilities and "with whom to use them and with whom to team up or not." She added, "We see Yo-Yo begin that conflict of whether she wants to belong to S.H.I.E.L.D. or not. I think at some point we've seen all the [S.H.I.E.L.D.] characters have doubts about the bureaucracy and the power struggle of S.H.I.E.L.D., but I think Yo-Yo's the one that the struggle is the most evident." Marvel Entertainment COO Joe Quesada described the series as an adventure that defines Rodriguez "and how she goes about doing her business as an Inhuman." The spin-off was the first time Cordova-Buckley led a series, which helped her learn to build a character.
 Jason O'Mara as Jeffrey Mace: The new Director of S.H.I.E.L.D., an Inhuman with super-strength and durability.
 Ming-Na Wen as Melinda May: An agent of S.H.I.E.L.D.
 Iain De Caestecker as Leo Fitz: An agent of S.H.I.E.L.D. who is an engineering and weapons technology specialist.
 Elizabeth Henstridge as Jemma Simmons: An agent of S.H.I.E.L.D. who is a biochemist specialist.
 Henry Simmons as Alphonso "Mack" Mackenzie: An agent of S.H.I.E.L.D. who is attracted to Rodriguez.

Recurring and guest 
 Yancey Arias as Victor Ramon: A former National Police of Colombia member-turned-arms dealer who killed Rodriguez's cousin.
 Alexander Wraith as Anderson: An agent of S.H.I.E.L.D.
 Deren Tadlock as Cecilio: An agent of S.H.I.E.L.D.
 Matt Berberi and Hiroo Minami as Ramon's henchman.
 Dale Pavinski as Alpha Dog: A member of the Watchdogs terrorist organization.

Stan Lee cameos through an on-set photograph.

Episodes

Production

Development 
Natalia Cordova-Buckley revealed on December 5, 2016 that a surprise teaser would air the next day following "The Laws of Inferno Dynamics", the mid-season finale of Agents of S.H.I.E.L.D.s fourth season. The teaser revealed Agents of S.H.I.E.L.D.: Slingshot, a 6-part digital series following Cordova-Buckley's S.H.I.E.L.D. character Elena "Yo-Yo" Rodriguez. Produced by ABC Studios and Marvel Television, each episode of the series is 3–6 minutes long. Maurissa Tancharoen, Jed Whedon, Jeffrey Bell, Jeph Loeb and Geoffrey Colo are executive producers on the series, with Colo described as the "mastermind behind" Slingshot. Colo said ABC and Marvel had been "looking for a while to do a digital series connected to Marvel's Agents of S.H.I.E.L.D. The trick was finding something that fit snugly into S.H.I.E.L.D.s timeline and the greater MCU".

Casting 
Cordova-Buckley was cast as Rodriguez in February 2016 for the third season of Agents of S.H.I.E.L.D., and was revealed to be starring in Slingshot with the December 2016 announcement. She is joined by other Agents of S.H.I.E.L.D. cast members Clark Gregg as Phil Coulson, Jason O'Mara as Jeffrey Mace, Henry Simmons as Alphonso "Mack" Mackenzie, Chloe Bennet as Daisy Johnson / Quake, Ming-Na Wen as Melinda May, Iain De Caestecker as Leo Fitz, and Elizabeth Henstridge as Jemma Simmons.

Yancey Arias recurs as arms dealer Victor Ramon, reprising his role from the Agents of S.H.I.E.L.D. episode "Bouncing Back". Also reprising their roles from S.H.I.E.L.D. are Alexander Wraith and Deren Tadlock as S.H.I.E.L.D. agents Anderson and Cecilio, and Dale Pavinski as the "Alpha Dog" of the Watchdogs.

Filming and visual effects 

Marvel Comics CCO Joe Quesada, who made his directorial debut with the first episode, created detailed storyboards of the episode like he would with a comic, stating, "The same rules of storytelling, whether its film or television, apply directly to comic books when you do it right." Much of the same crew that works on the main S.H.I.E.L.D. series also worked on Slingshot, including visual effects supervisor Mark Kolpack who returned to supervise the effects for Slingshot. Kolpack also directed the final episode of the spin-off.

Marvel Cinematic Universe tie-ins 
The majority of the digital series takes place shortly before the events of the fourth season of Agents of S.H.I.E.L.D., which Quesada said would allow the series to tell the story "that is in between the cracks" and explore "missing time" since the end of Agents of S.H.I.E.L.D. season three. Cordova-Buckley added that Slingshot would help viewers "understand the reasoning for many of the decisions that characters make in Season 4," gaining "more of an overall answer of the 'why's'." Such insights include "the struggle between Yo-Yo and Mack, ... the closeness between Daisy and Yo-Yo, ... [and] the relationship between Yo-Yo and S.H.I.E.L.D." from her interactions with Mace and Coulson. In addition, Peggy Carter, Secretary Thaddeus "Thunderbolt" Ross, and his prison The Raft are referenced.

Release 
All six episodes of Agents of S.H.I.E.L.D.: Slingshot debuted on ABC.com on December 13, 2016. The episodes were also available on ABC's mobile app, Marvel.com, and ABC and Marvel's YouTube channels.

Reception

Critical response 
Christina Roberts of Culturess felt Slingshot was "a cool premise" that built off established Agents of S.H.I.E.L.D. characters and expanded on those less used. Roberts also felt Slingshot could have worked as a standalone episode of the main series since those episodes are "always a nice breath of fresh air", and was curious if Slingshot would be referenced in Agents of S.H.I.E.L.D., "even if it's just a wink and a nod between Daisy and Elena." Geek Exchanges Georgia Ringelberg called Slingshot "unnecessary because the plot doesn't add anything to the larger series". Despite this, it was "a fun, quick watch that's perfect for getting through the mid-season break". Additionally, Ringelberg felt the use of Rodriguez in the series gave the character "some well-deserved attention" and would lead "to more screen time" including "maybe even preparing viewers for the Inhumans series... If they transition her to Inhumans or give her time on both shows, she could be strategically utilized instead of mostly forgotten the way she is now."

Accolades 

|-
! scope="row" rowspan="5" | 2017
| Webby Awards
| Drama: Long Form or Series
| Agents of S.H.I.E.L.D.: Slingshot
| 
| 
|-
| Primetime Creative Arts Emmy Awards
| Outstanding Short Form Comedy or Drama Series
| Agents of S.H.I.E.L.D.: Slingshot
| 
| 
|-
| Streamy Awards
| Costume Design
| Ann Foley
| 
| 
|-
| rowspan="2" | Writers Guild of America Awards
| rowspan="2" | Short Form New Media – Adapted
| "John Hancock"
| 
| 
|-
| "Justicia"
| 
| 
|}

References 

Episodes

  5 minutes. YouTube url
  3 minutes. YouTube url
  6 minutes. YouTube url
  4 minutes. YouTube url
  4 minutes. YouTube url
  3 minutes. YouTube url

External links 
 
 
 
 

2010s American drama television series
2010s American science fiction television series
2016 web series debuts
2016 web series endings
ABC.com original programming
Action adventure web series
Slingshot
American action television series
American science fiction web series
English-language television shows
Espionage television series
Marvel Cinematic Universe web series
Serial drama television series
Superhero science fiction web series
Television series based on works by Brian Michael Bendis
Television series set in the 2010s
Television shows filmed in Los Angeles
Television shows set in Baltimore
American drama web series